Salcia is a commune in Teleorman County, Muntenia, Romania. It is composed of three villages: Băneasa, Salcia and Tudor Vladimirescu.

Famous residents include writer Zaharia Stancu (1902 – 1974).

References

Communes in Teleorman County
Localities in Muntenia